Verrucula arnoldaria is a rare species of lichenicolous (lichen-dwelling) lichen in the family Verrucariaceae. It grows parasitically on the thallus of the rock-dwelling, crustose lichen Calogaya arnoldii. The species was formally described as new to science in 2007 by lichenologists Père Navarro-Rosinés and Claude Roux, from specimens collected in Vaucluse, France. It has also been recorded from Italy. The lichen has a thick brownish-grey, areolate thallus that roughly maintains the shape of its underlying host. The thallus is covered with a crystalline pruina. It makes ellipsoid spores that measure up to about 15 μm long. Its host grows on calciferous rocks and calciferous schists.

References

Verrucariales
Lichens described in 2007
Lichens of Southwestern Europe
Lichens of Southeastern Europe
Taxa named by Claude Roux
Lichenicolous lichens